Phi Delta Psi Fraternity, Inc. is a social fraternity. It was founded as an African American fraternity in 1977 on the campus of Western Michigan University.

History

Phi Delta Psi was founded as an African American fraternity on the predominately white campus of Western Michigan University on March 27, 1977. Its Founding Fathers include Kwameh Barnett, Derek Bell, Richard Bell, Gregory Brown, Charles Cameron, Gerald Dixon, Denis Jones, Peter McClain, Michael Mosby, and Daulton Tansil.

Phi Delta Psi was founded on eternal honor, perseverance, leadership, achievement, and brotherhood. Its founding fathers wanted to create a fraternity that would meet the social, economic, and political challenges of African American men. The fraternity continues to honor its founders' mantra of community service for the benefit of its universities, families, communities, and the world.

One of the fraternity's first initiatives was its Sickle Cell Testing Initiative, followed by Great American Smokeout. The group's current project is Stopping Aids by Forever Educating or the S.A.F.E Initiative. Its publication is The Lion's Den.

Chapters
Following are the Phi Delta Psi chapters. Active chapters are indicated in bold. Inactive chapters are shown in italic. Note that the Phi Delta Psi local fraternity established in 1966 at Southern New Hampshire University has never been affiliated with this organization.

Notes

See also
List of African-American fraternities
List of social fraternities and sororities

References

Student organizations established in 1977
1977 establishments in Michigan
Fraternities and sororities in the United States
Western Michigan University
Non-profit organizations based in Michigan
African-American fraternities and sororities